Kampala Tower, sometimes referred to as the East African Trade Centre, is a proposed building in Kampala, the capital of Uganda and the largest city in that country.

Location
The coordinates of Kampala Tower are:0° 20' 6.00"N, 32° 34' 57.00"E (Latitude:0.3350; Longitude:32.5825).

Overview
Kampala Tower will sit on a  site that currently houses the Uganda National Museum and the headquarters of Uganda Wildlife Authority, both of which will be relocated. Other nearby structures, including Kitante Primary School, may have to temporarily relocate while construction is going on. The tower will serve as the headquarters of the Ugandan Ministry of Tourism, Trade & Industry. In addition, the building will provide upscale rentable office and retail space in this rapidly-expanding neighborhood of Uganda's capital city.

History
The lead planning institution is the development of this project is the Uganda Ministry of Tourism, Trade & Industry. Working with those original concepts, the London-based architectural firm Capita Symonds, assisted by the Ugandan firm Plan Systems Limited, drew several architectural designs for the Ugandan government to select from. In 2010, the architects presented their final drawings to the Ugandan Government for final approval.

Construction costs
, the estimated construction costs were US$750 million (UGX:1.83 trillion). This estimate is likely to go up, due to increased costs of building materials since that time. Government is currently sourcing for a private investor, who will fund the construction, own and operate the building for 30 years following commissioning. It is anticipated that by that time, the investor would have recouped his/her investment with reasonable profit. The building would revert to the Ugandan government following the thirty-year period. Construction was originally planned to start in 2011 and last 6 to 8 years. , the development is on hold, while a private investor is sought.

Controversy
The development of Kampala Tower has been strongly opposed by a wide section of society. Currently, there is a civil lawsuit winding its way through the Ugandan court system, that was filed by a consortium of civil society organisations that are opposed to the project.

See also
 List of tallest buildings in Kampala
 List of tallest buildings in Africa
 Kampala

Photos and diagrams
Artistic Rendering of Kampala Tower

References

External links
 Website of the Uganda Ministry of Tourism, Trade and Industry
Firm Designs 222 Meters High Tower High Tower For Ugandan Capital

Buildings and structures in Kampala
Skyscraper office buildings in Uganda